Maria Callist Soosa Pakiam (born 11 March 1946) is the  Archbishop Emeritus of the Latin Rite Archdiocese of Trivandrum.

Biography
Born in Neerodi village of Kanyakumari district in Tamil Nadu, Maria Calista Soosa Pakiam alias M. Soosa Pakiam was ordained as a Priest on 20 December 1969 at the age of 23. Pope John Paul II named him coadjutor bishop of Thiruvananthapuram in December 1989.

He was consecrated as a bishop on 2 February 1990 and took over from Emeritus bishop Rev. Dr. Jacob Acharuparambil as Bishop of Thiruvananthapuram in January 1991. He became the first metropolitan Archbishop of newly erected Thiruvananthapuram archdiocese On 23 June 2004.

Soosa Pakiam has headed the KCBC and Kerala region Latin catholic bishop council.

On 22 February 2021, Soosa Pakiam unofficially retired due to ailing health and Auxiliary Bishop Christudas Rajappan took over his duties. On 2 February 2022, Pope Francis officially accepted Soosa Pakiam's resignation and named Dr. Fr. Thomas J. Netto as the archbishop of Trivandrum.

Position Held 
• Bishop of Thiruvananthapuram (31 January 1991 - 3 June 2004)

• Archbishop of Thiruvananthapuram (3 June 2004 - 18 March 2022)

• President of Kerala Catholic Bishop Council (2016 - 2019)

• Apostolic Administrator of Thiruvananthapuram (2  February 2022 - 19 March 2022)

• Archbishop  Emeritus of Trivandrum (19 March 2022 - Present)

References

21st-century Roman Catholic archbishops in India
1946 births
Living people
People from Kanyakumari district